Jirat is a census town  located in Hooghly District in the Indian State of West Bengal. It is the administrative headquarter of Balagarh Block. It is birthplace of the Dr. Gangaprasad Mukherjee, Writer

Charuchandra Banerjee, Tollywood actor Anil Charteree, Sonet Writer Debendranath Senthe Poet Mohitlal Majumder etc. 2kms south from Jirat Railway Station Smitimandir has a beautiful Radhagopinath temple. Annual festival of 'Pancham dol' is held here during the month of March and the famous 'Rash Utsab' in November.Smitimandir has also Hanuman Balaji temple.Main festival 'Hanuman Jayanti' held  during the month of April. 1kms east from Jirat station is the historical place of Kaliagarh, the banks of river  Bhagirathi was the 'Gang of Dacoits' settlement in Hooghly District. It has an ancient Kali and Siva temple, which is the oldest temple in Jirat. The Siva temple name of 'Mahakal Bhairav' has sculptured terra-cotta tiles representing ships , Hindu God's scencs from the Ramayana.

Geography

Location
Jirat is the Main Administrative Center (Sadar) of Balagarh Block.  Balagarh BDO Office are located in Jirat.
The Balagarh CD Block is mostly part of the Hooghly Flats, one of the three natural regions in the district composed of the flat alluvial plains that form a part of the Gangetic Delta. The region is a narrow strip of land along the 80 km long stretch of the Hooghly River, that forms the eastern boundary of the district.

Urbanisation
There are 13 statutory towns and 64 census towns in Hooghly district. The right bank of the Hooghly River has been industrialised over a long period. With foreigners dominating the area’s industry, trade and commerce for over two centuries, it is amongst the leading industrialised districts in the state. At the same time the land is fertile and agricultural production is significant.

In Chinsurah subdivision 68.63% of the population is rural and the urban population is 31.37%. It has 2 statutory and 23 census towns. In Chinsurah Mogra CD Block 64.87% of the population is urban and 35.13% is rural. Amongst the four remaining CD Blocks in the subdivision two were overwhelmingly rural and two were wholly rural.

The map above shows a portion of Chinsurah subdivision. All places marked in the map are linked in the larger full screen map.

Religions 
Hinduism is majority religion in Jirat. Islam is second most popular religion, most of the Muslim population situated in Dwarpara. Christianity is followed by minority of peoples.

Demographics
As per the 2011 Census of India, Jirat had a total population of 7,430, of which 3,824 (51%) were males and 3,606 (49%) were females. The total number of literates in Jirat was 5,308 (79.01% of the population over 6 years).

Transport

Railway
Jirat railway station is an important railway station in the Bandel-Katwa Branch Line.

By Road
The State Highway 6 (West Bengal) passes through Jirat, connects Tribeni, Kalna, Nabadwip and Katwa by road.

Airlines
The nearest airport is Netaji Subhas Chandra Bose International Airport, Dum Dum (58 kilometres distanced).

Driving Distance to Kolkata

Bus Route
Jirat is connected with Chuchura by Bus (Bus Route 8).

Autorickshaw and Jeep Cars
Jirat is connected with Mogra, Tribeni, Guptipara by autorickshaw and Jeep Cars.

Temples

The oldest temples in Jirat are:
 Sri Sri Radhagapinath Jeu 
 Sideswari Kali and Mahakal Bairav Temple 
 Sri Sri Sarvamangala Kalimata Temple
 Darmaraj Temple 
 Bura Siva Temple 
 Sri Sri Hanuman Balaji Temple
 Jora Siva Temple 
 Sri Sri Mrinmoyee Kalimata Temple
 Pravu Jagannath Temple

Festivals
Durga Puja is the main attraction of the town. Among the old houses where Durga Puja is held are 'Mathbari', 'Borobari', 'Chotobari', 'Bhanubabur Bari' and 'Roy Bari'. People of Jirat celebrates Kali Puja, Saraswati Puja,  Rash Utsav, Hurum Mela, Panchamdol, Rathyatra too.

Healthcare
A variety of hospitals, nursing homes, and sub-health centers have branches in Jirat, with notable examples being Jirat Rural Hospital, Ahammedpur Block Health Care Center, Envision Eye Foundation, Aastha Nursing Home etc.

Education

College
 Balagarh Bijoy Krishna Mahavidyalaya (Jirat College)

School(s)
 Jirat Colony High School
 Holy Child Academy(Not any board school normal Private School with few teachers)
 Kabura Panchpara High School
 Ashutosh Smritimandir Girls High School 
 Balagarh High School

Sport School
 Jirat Cricket Academy (Cricket Academy)

Notable Persons
 Sir Ashutosh Mukherjee, Educator and Vice-Chancellor of the University of Calcutta
 Panchanan Karmakar, Inventor of wooden Bengali alphabet typeface
 Shyama Prasad Mukherjee, Politician
 Anil Chatterjee, Indian Actor
 Mohitlal Majumdar, Poet
 Ashim Kumar Majhi, Indian Politician

References 

Cities and towns in Hooghly district